Engin Altan Düzyatan (born 26 July 1979) is a Turkish film and television actor. Born in Karşıyaka, İzmir Province, Turkey, Düzyatan studied theatre at the Dokuz Eylül University in his home province before making his acting debut with Ruhsar (2001). He then went on to act in various roles in film and television in Turkey.

Düzyatan rose to international prominence for his role as Ertuğrul Bey in Diriliş: Ertuğrul. In 2020 and 2023, He was named in The Muslim 500 as one of the most Influential Muslims in  the world. He is also well known for his charitable works in Africa where he set up access to clean drinking water for over 100,000 people.

Early life 
Düzyatan was born on 26 July 1979, in Karşıyaka, İzmir, Turkey, to Mevlan and Gülşen Düzyatan.
Engin Altan Düzyatan began acting during his high school days. His family is Turkish immigrants from Yugoslavia. He joined Dokuz Eylül University to study theatre. He completed his course and moved to İstanbul where he started his professional acting career.

Career

Early roles 

He made his screen debut with guest roles in the hit fantasy series Ruhsar and hit series Yeditepe İstanbul, Alacakaranlık. He had leading role in youth series Koçum Benim with veteran actor Tarık Akan. In 2007, Düzyatan played in the romantic comedy series Sevgili Dünürüm with Haluk Bilginer, Sumru Yavrucuk and Nevra Serezli. In 2009, he played Doctor Serdar Batur in the series Bir Bulut Olsam with Melisa Sözen and Engin Akyürek, written by Meral Okay. After he played together in "Bir Avuç Deniz", "Son", "Kurşun", "Beyza'nın Kadınları", "Affedilmeyen" with Berrak Tüzünataç, Their crime series "Son" was sold to USA, France, Spain, Russian, Netherlands for adaptation. He played in historical series "Yol Ayrımı", "Çırağan Baskını", "Hürrem Sultan". In 2014, he appeared in the crime series Cinayet with Nurgül Yeşilçay, Uğur Polat, Şükran Ovalı, Ahmet Mümtaz Taylan and Goncagül Sunar.

In 2005, he acted in the films Beyza'nın Kadınları, with Demet Evgar directed by Mustafa Altıoklar, and Kalbin Zamanı with Hülya Avşar. His next roles were mentally disabled and cripple in the films "Cennet" (2008) with Fahriye Evcen and "Ve Panayır Köyden Gider"(2015). Düzyatan acted in the films Romantik Komedi, New York'ta Beş Minare with Haluk Bilginer and Bir Avuç Deniz in 2010. He played the sequel film "Romantik Komedi 2: Bekarlığa Veda" with Sinem Kobal.He played in airforce film Anadolu Kartalları. He played in period film "Bu Son Olsun" with Hazal Kaya and "Bu İşte Bir Yalnızlık Var" which based on novel with Özgü Namal.

He hosted the game show Canlı Para which is Turkish version of The Million Pound Drop Live on Show TV in 2010 and 2011.

Diriliş: Ertuğrul and later roles 

From 2014 until 2019, Düzyatan starred in the TV series Diriliş: Ertuğrul as the eponymous character on TRT 1. Düzyatan was initially reluctant to accept the role, fearing the show would be "ridiculous". He read 13th century works such as the Book of Dede Korkut in preparation for the part. Düzyatan called Ertuğrul "a real hero", and "smart, mature and just", praising his "vision, strength, purpose in life and all of his values", and feeling his portrayal was important in providing a Turkish equivalent to Batman and Spider-Man. Düzyatan is playing the role of Oruç Reis Barbarossa in the Turkish TV series Barbaroslar in 2021.

Public image and personal life 
On 28 August 2014, he married the granddaughter of Selim Soydan and Hülya Koçyiğit, Neslişah Alkoçlar. The couple has a son, Emir Aras (born 2016) and a daughter, Alara (born 2018).

In 2020, Düzyatan went on a short visit to Pakistan, where Diriliş: Ertuğrul has gained popularity, accepting the invitation of a private business company. Pakistan's Make-A-Wish Foundation arranged a meeting between Düzyatan and three young terminally ill fans; when there, Engin said, "Thank you very much, I can see I inspired you and I am very happy for this love." After signing an agreement with the Lahore-based Chaudhary Group of Companies, of which he was a brand ambassador, he visited Lahore and became one of the top discussions on social media and one of his pictures with a lion went viral. Düzyatan also wishes to appear in a Pakistani drama series one day, "if it has a good story."

Two statues of Ertuğrul on horseback inspired by Düzyatan's portrayal of Ertuğrul in Diriliş: Ertuğrul were placed by a private cooperative housing society in Lahore, Pakistan in 2020. A bust of the character was also erected in Ordu, Turkey in 2020, although it was removed by local authorities after a resemblance Düzyatan was pointed out. Düzyatan was named by 'The Muslim 500' as one of the world's most influential Muslims in 2020. Düzyatan's Diriliş: Ertuğrul co-star Nurettin Sönmez felt filming for the scene of Ertuğrul's death in Kuruluş: Osman was difficult due to Düzyatan's legacy in playing the character. Düzyatan supported the Turkish government's decision to reconvert Hagia Sophia into a mosque in 2020.

Filmography

TV series

Films

Short films

Dubbing

Theatre

Presenter

Awards and Nominations

References

External links
 

1979 births
Living people
Actors from İzmir
Turkish Muslims
Turkish male film actors
Turkish male television actors
21st-century Turkish male actors
Macedonian Turks